Espen de Lange is a former Norwegian curler and curling coach.

Teams

Record as a coach of national teams

References

External links
 
 Bak uniformen Curlingspilleren | Perspektiv - Widerøes nettmagasin 
 Odel røyk mot gullvinneren fra OL i Salt Lake City – Odel Curling 

Norwegian male curlers
European curling champions
Norwegian curling coaches
20th-century Norwegian people